Jeannette "Jenny" Hermine Kastein (24 January 1913 – 20 October 2000) was a Dutch breaststroke swimmer. She won a silver medal in the 200 m breaststroke at the 1931 European Championships, behind Cecelia Wolstenholme. Next year she set four world records in the 400 m and 500 m breastroke (unofficial events), but could not compete in the Olympics due to the overall financial problems related to the Great Depression. She won the national titles in the 200 m in 1933, 1935 and 1936, yet her performance declined, and at the 1936 Summer Olympics she finished in a mere seventh place.

In 1942, Kastein married Evert Heleonardus Scheijde, a physician; they had two sons.

References

1913 births
2000 deaths
Dutch female breaststroke swimmers
Olympic swimmers of the Netherlands
Swimmers at the 1936 Summer Olympics
Swimmers from Amsterdam
European Aquatics Championships medalists in swimming
20th-century Dutch women